Prudential regulation is a type of financial regulation that requires financial firms to control risks and hold adequate capital as defined by capital requirements, liquidity requirements, by the imposition of concentration risk (or large exposures) limits, and by related reporting and public disclosure requirements and supervisory controls and processes.

Prudential regulation can be split into microprudential regulation that focuses on the individual firms and making sure that they can withstand shocks and macroprudential regulation that looks at the whole financial system and systemic risk.  

Some countries have separated their financial regulators along the lines of prudential/consumer protection such as the UK with the Prudential Regulation Authority or in Australia with the Australian Prudential Regulation Authority.

References